The 2022–23 CCHA men's ice hockey season is the 44th season of play for the Central Collegiate Hockey Association and is part of the 2022–23 NCAA Division I men's ice hockey season. The regular season began on October 1, 2022, and will conclude on February 25, 2023. The conference tournament is set to begin on March 3.

Coaches

Records

Standings

Non-Conference record
Of the sixteen teams that are selected to participate in the NCAA tournament, ten will be via at-large bids. Those 10 teams are determined based upon the PairWise rankings. The rankings take into account all games played but are heavily affected by intra-conference results. The result is that teams from leagues which perform better in non-conference are much more likely to receive at-large bids even if they possess inferior records overall.

The CCHA had a poor season in non-conference play. Just two teams finished with a winning record while half of the conference produced just 6 wins in a total of 31 games. The CCHA produced a winning record against just one other conference (ECAC) as well as the independent programs, however, many of those victories came against low-ranking opponents and only minimally improved the CCHA's standing.

Regular season record

Statistics

Leading scorers
GP = Games played; G = Goals; A = Assists; Pts = Points; PIM = Penalty minutes

Leading goaltenders
Minimum 1/3 of team's minutes played in conference games.

GP = Games played; Min = Minutes played; W = Wins; L = Losses; T = Ties; GA = Goals against; SO = Shutouts; SV% = Save percentage; GAA = Goals against average

CCHA Tournament

NCAA tournament

Ranking

USCHO

USA Today

Pairwise

Note: teams ranked in the top-10 automatically qualify for the NCAA tournament. Teams ranked 11-16 can qualify based upon conference tournament results.

Awards

CCHA

References

External links

2022–23
CCHA
2022–23